The Ribble Steam Railway is a standard gauge preserved railway in Lancashire, in the United Kingdom.  It was opened to the public on 17 September 2005, running along Preston Docks. The railway began by housing much of the collection from the previously closed Southport Railway Museum (Steamport), which was based in the old Lancashire and Yorkshire Railway engine shed at Southport (BR shed code 27C).

The railway lines around Preston Dock largely fell into disuse after the closure of the docks. A preservation group that was operating in Southport relocated to Preston in 1999 and started operations as the Ribble Steam Railway in 2005. Its operations base is at  but they run trains as far as Strand Road although there is no facility for locomotives to run round their train here.

The Riverside station is quite a way from Preston city centre, but proposals have been made for a platform to be constructed at Strand Road. This would be close to the Portway terminus of the Preston park and ride service, Guild Wheel walking trail and the River Ribble.

History
The project was first started in 1973, a preservation centre opened in Southport, on the former Lancashire and Yorkshire Railway steam shed at Derby Road. However, the shed was becoming a costly burden to handle for the museum, so a relocation scheme was started. Preston Docks was chosen as the new location for the museum. Preston Docks has a large railway network, that used to serve the vast docks and quays. But when the docks closed, the railway was not used. The project finally closed the Southport Railway Museum in 1999.

The project's new site now could be re-developed with new large workshops, platforms and a museum. The first building to open was the workshop, in 2001. Locomotives could now go into the building, and more space could now be utilised. Next to the workshop, is the machine shop, built in 1978. At the other end of the workshop is the visitor centre, which contains the museum, cafe, shop and railway platform. The museum was finally completed in 2004. The collection of locomotives (61, one on loan from the National Railway Museum, one from the Lancashire and Yorkshire Railway Trust. 55 are currently on site.), is one of the largest collection of locomotives in the United Kingdom.

Operations
The museum also operates passenger services to Strand Road Crossing and back, from its own station – Preston Riverside. The frequency of its trains is hourly, and are usually made up of two or more Mark 1 coaches and a small steam engine or diesel engine.

Future
There have also been plans to extend the railway to the Ribble Link canal. The route would offer 1.5 miles extra to the line, although plans for this have not been finalised as major funding streams need to be found, in order to raise the huge amount of funds required for such a significant project.

Strand Road Crossing

Strand Road Crossing is a level crossing in Preston, Lancashire. It is situated on a freight-only branch line from Preston railway station which is used by trains serving Preston Docks. The Ribble Steam Railway terminates adjacent to the level crossing and it is proposed that a station should be built on the site.

Freight traffic

The only regular freight traffic in 2015 is bitumen which is brought in 15 tank wagons from Lindsey Oil Refinery for Total three times each week. After crossing the road it is taken a short distance further to a group of three railway tracks. The main line locomotive switches to a train of empty wagons while a small diesel locomotive takes the full train on to the Lanfina Siding which is adjacent to Lockside Road near  station.

See also
 Riversway
 Riversway railway station
 Strand Road Crossing
 Preston
 List of transport museums

References

External links 

 
 Information on the railway, Preston Docks 
 Pictures of the railway
 videos of the Ribble Steam Railway, YouTube
 Strand Road Crossing - YouTube clips of train crossing

 
Heritage railways in Lancashire
Tourist attractions in Preston
Railway lines opened in 1882
Railway lines opened in 2005
Museums in Preston
Transport in Preston
Railway museums in England